Natasha St. Louis (born 1 November 1991) is a Trinidad and Tobago footballer who plays as a forward. She has been a member of the Trinidad and Tobago women's national team.

International career
St. Louis represented Trinidad and Tobago at the 2010 CONCACAF Women's U-20 Championship. At senior level, she capped during two CONCACAF Women's Championship editions (2010 and 2018), two Central American and Caribbean Games editions (2014 and 2018) and the 2018 CFU Women's Challenge Series.

International goals
Scores and results list Trinidad and Tobago' goal tally first.

References

1991 births
Living people
Women's association football forwards
Trinidad and Tobago women's footballers
Trinidad and Tobago women's international footballers
Competitors at the 2014 Central American and Caribbean Games
Competitors at the 2018 Central American and Caribbean Games